The McGlashan BB Machine Gun is a training weapon capable of firing BBs.

During World War II, the USAAF and US Navy used thousands of MacGlashan BB machine guns to hone the skills of aerial gunnery. This much larger gun is cycled by an electric solenoid and powered by compressed air. The air pressure is higher, at 180-200 psi, but the velocity is 

The MacGlashan Air Machine Gun company also made a McGlashan Coin Shooting Pistol for the carnival trade during the 1940s that would shoot American five cent pieces.

References

Bibliography

Note:  Other than the manuals and Army and Navy files, most of the following documents provide only a passing mention or illustration of the MacGlashan guns, and are useful mainly for identifying locations of ranges and the context of the use of the guns.

Books																	       Call Number

An Air-Operated Machine-Gun, in "Air Guns and Pistols" by L Wesley and revised by GV Cardew,  7th Edition,  1979.
, 

Blue Book of Airguns, 7th Edition, by Robert D. Beeman and John B. Allen, Blue Book Publications, Inc., 2008                                                       TS537.5 .B45 
 

Bombs Away, The Story of a Bomber Team, John Steinbeck, 1942 ,  New York, The Viking Press,  p. 78.                    		                        UG633 .S77

Wings for Combat, The Story of the Training  of an Air Force, Army Air Forces Training Command, 1943,  Brooklyn, N.Y., The Ullman Company, Inc., p. 49
,                                                                                                                                                 UG633.A46 1943k

Air Machine Guns, Larry Behling, 2006 														 TS537.5 .B46 2006

Galan, Jess. 1978. "The BB Approach to World War Deuce Saved Money in Training," pp. 54–57.                                                                             TS537.5 .B43
In:  Air Gun Digest.(second edition), Robert Beeman, Jack P. Lewis 256 pp. DBI Books, Northfield, Illinois, January 1977,
, 

Manuals

Mac Glashan Air Machine Gun, Mac Glashan Air Machine Gun Corp., Long Beach, CA.,  n.d., 41 p.

Type E-3 Aerial Gunnery Trainer, Handbook of Instructions with Parts Catalog, Technical Order 11-1-5, February 20, 1943, 23 p.                   NASM, LOC PB44227

Aerial Gunnery Trainer, Type E-13, Handbook of Instructions with Parts Catalog,  Technical Order AN 11-65-11, February 20, 1944, 23 p. LOC  PB44880

Fixed Gunnery Trainer Type E-12, Handbook of Instructions with Parts Catalog, Technical Order AN 28-10-8,  April 25, 1944, 175 p. LOC PB 44118

Fighter Gunnery, 1st edition, Army Air Forces Training Command, June 1944, 115 p., p. 61                                                                                     UG630 .U639

Free Gunnery Instructor's Training Manual,  Training Division, Bureau of Aeronautics, Navy Department, USGPO, Washington D.C., 1943,          VG90 .U63 1943a
p. 115, 120-123, Figs. 108-110. 		

Handbook of Description, Armament Training Devices, Technical Order 11-65-12, January 25, 1944, ( E-13, p. 9,  E-3, p. 20-21)                               LOC PB 44881

Source note: NASM = National Air and Space Museum Archives,  LOC = Library of Congress Photoduplication Service,  PB = document identifying number

National Archives

Gun, Air Tommy - MacGlashan Air Machine Gun Co., 1941-42-43-44, File 2884, 472.5
Engineering Division, Materiel Command, WPAFB R&D Files, ARC Identifier 2981754  (Now 40550212)  Container Identifier: 2449  HMS Entry Number(s): P 26 
Records of U.S. Air Force Commands, Activities & Organizations
Records Group 342, National Archives at College Park, College Park, MD

MacGlashan Air Machine Gun, File QM8210
Bureau of Aeronautics General Correspondence, 1925-1942
Records Group 72, Entry 15, National Archives Building, Washington, DC

MacGlashan Air Machine Gun, File QM8210
Bureau of Aeronautics General Correspondence, 1943 chronological subseries
Records Group 72, National Archives at College Park, College Park, MD

Report on Special Devices Division, Rutherford, John P., Lt USNR, Bureau of Supplies and Accounts, Cost Inspection Service, Bureau of Aeronautics, 1945, Schedule 3, Device 3-A-8, 
National Archives at College Park, College Park, MD.  Unfortunately, no further location information is available, though it is believed to be somewhere in Records Group 72.

Infantry Board Report 1480: Air Machine Gun Trainers (AntiAircraft Machine Gun Trainer M9 & MacGlashan Air Machine Gun)  April 30, 1943
Record Group 337 Entry (UD) 4 U.S. Army Ground Forces. Infantry Board Reports (1943) Box 86 [Stack Location: 190/73/34/00]

The following specifications are in Air Materiel Command. Engineering Division. Central Files Unit,  Records Group 342, National Archives at College Park, College Park, MD

Air Corps Specification 24733  Trainer, Aerial Gunnery, Type E-3,  August 22, 1941,  ARC Identifier 4589590

U.S. Army Specification 94-24733, Trainer, Aerial Gunnery, Type E-3,  Apr 13, 1942,  ARC Identifier 4589590

U.S. Army Specification 94-24733, Amendment 1, Trainer, Aerial Gunnery, Type E-3,  Apr 2, 1943,  ARC Identifier 4589590

U.S. Army Specification 94-24733-A  Trainer, Aerial Gunnery, Type E-3,  Apr 14, 1943, ARC Identifier 4589590

Army Air Forces Specification No. 24872, Trainer - Aerial Gunnery, Type E-13   June 24, 1943,  ARC Identifier 4589622

Expenditure Order File 554-1-179, Scoring target for type E-3 aerial gunnery trainer, ARC Indentifier 4591013

Expenditure Order File 668-3, Fixed Gunnery Trainer, Type E-12, [RD 2717], ARC Identifier  4641595

Miscellaneous

Army Air Forces Synthetic Devices Catalog, Army Air Forces Training Aids Division, 1 Jan  1944, p 4-5, Link Fixed Gunnery Range

Catalog, Synthetic Training Devices, BuAer, Special Devices Division, July 1943, Device 3-A-8

Progress Reports of the Special Devices Section for Calendar Year 1942, Parts I and II, Jan-June, Jul-Dec., History Committee of the Naval Air Warfare Training Systems Division, Orlando, Florida

Sparton in World War II, The Sparks-Withington Company, Jackson, Michigan, n.d., circa 1945

USAAF Type Designation Sheet, Classification Name: Trainer Flexible, Letter: E,  Basic Character: Aerial Gunnery

U.S. Naval Administrative History of World War II No. 8,  Office of Research and Inventions, 1 July-31 December 1945, p. 113

U.S. Patent 2,364,070,  J.E. Haile, Jr., Aerial Gunnery Trainer, December 5, 1944

Magazine articles  (chronogically)

LIFE, July 13, 1942, Vol. 13, No. 2, p. 44, center, photograph of BB machine gun firing line at Las Vegas, Eliot Elisofon

POPULAR SCIENCE, April 1943, Vol. 142, No. 4,  "Flying Sharpshooters," Andrew H. Boone, p. 121, top left, photograph of Navy Model

TIME, April 5, 1943, "Gunners' Assembly Line", Mention of BB machine guns at Fort Myers

LIFE, June 28, 1943, Vol. 14, No. 26, p. 42, top, photograph of compressed-air machine gun range at NAGS, Jacksonville, Myron H. Davis

AIR TRAILS Pictorial, Vol. XXI, No. 1, October 1943,  p. 46, center,  photograph of E-12 Fixed Gunnery Trainer at AAF School of Applied Tactics, Orlando, 
Harold W. Kulick

MECHANIX ILLUSTRATED, November 1943, Vol. XXXI, No. 1, "How the Navy Trains Aerial Gunners", Arch Whitehouse, p. 42-44, 154-155

AVIATION, December 1943, Vol. 42, No. 12, "How Gunners Learn to Wing 'Em", p. 221-225, 304-308, p. 223, photograph of BB Link trainer

SKYWAYS, Vol. 3, No. 1, January 1944,  "Gunners Can't Miss", p. 34-5, photographs by Harold Kulick 
 
GUN SPORT & GUN COLLECTOR,  May, 1974, p. 22-25, "BB Machine Gun From WWII - The MacGlashan", J. I. Galan

SHOTGUN NEWS, November 6, 2006, Vol. 60, No. 30, "Air Machine Guns!", Tom Gaylord, p. 26-28

AIRGUN HOBBY MAGAZINE, Vol 6, No. 2, April–May–June, 2009,  "The McGlashan Air Machine Gun", Larry Behling, p. 31

Internet Web Links

One Down, One Dead By Frank Speer, p. 23
https://books.google.com/books?id=b3Tev9dd4CIC&pg=PA23&lpg=PA23&dq=bb+%22link+trainer%22&source=web&ots=BlVJVEOeip&sig=Au298qK1dlEo0XvV4ofArK-6zTA

Some pictures and comments regarding the MacGlashan machine gun
http://www.jobrelatedstuff.com/lite/topic.html?b=6&f=2&t=211549

BB Machinegun.com Reviews
http://www.geocities.com/bbmachinegun/review11.htm

MacGlashan E-3 at Daisy Museum (SN 10180)
http://users.aristotle.net/~russjohn/daisy.html

MacGlashan guns
http://www.pyramydair.com/blog/2006/08/new-book-about-air-machine-guns.html

Two photos of a MacGlashan range, probably at Pensacola
http://liberatorcrew.com/15_Gunnery/11_Training.htm

Interesting forum posts
http://bb.bbboy.net/straferbbmachinegunownersgroup

The Most Collectible Airguns of the Twentieth Century, by Robert D. Beeman
http://www.beemans.net/airguncollecting.htm

Folding wing target gliders
http://www.americanjuniorclassics.com/interceptor/interceptorhome.htm

Air guns of the United States